is a Japanese idol, actor, and member of the idol group Sexy Zone, under the Johnny & Associates from 30 October 2010.

Biography
He was born on 30 October 1996. The youngest of four siblings, he has two brothers and a sister. His given name, Shori, means "win" in Japanese. The name was given by his father who wished that he could win, achieve, and overcome anything. He has 2 brothers and a sister.

During middle school, Shori was in the Field and Track Club and is specialized in 3000m running. In his 3rd year, he became the captain of the club. On his third year, his eyesight become worsened so he had wear glasses; he wears a contact lenses now

Shori started his primary school in April 2004 and enrolled at Megurogu State school, and graduated in 2010. In April 2010, he entered Meguro Kuritsu Dainana Junior High School and graduated in March 2013. In April 2013, he went to Horikoshi Gakuen, a school known for the enrollment of the famous high schoolers. He graduated in March 2015 at the age of 18 years old.

At a press conference on the first day of Johnny's All Stars Island in January 2017, Shori announced that his father had died in September 2016, due to an illness at age 57.

Timeline
 30 October 2010: Entered Johnny 's office.
 29 September 2011: Along with the formation of Sexy Zone, it will be announced that a CD debut will take place in November. 
 7 April 2012: Participated in the Ford Island Bridge Run held on Oahu, Hawaii, United States. He gave a record of 42 minutes 42 seconds.
 26 July 2013: Became a special supporter and main supporter of the women's volleyball World Grand Prix 2013.
 6 October 2013: First lead role the Nihon TV's television drama, 49.
 29 July 2014: Sexy Zone's first solo concert was held at EX Theater Roppongi. An additional performance was also held on 11 August.
 August 2015: It was decided that the group will perform a solo concert named "Sexy Zone A. B. C - Z Summer Paradise in TDC."
 August 2016: Performed a solo concert at "Summer Paradise 2016."
 4 March 2017: Getting his first lead role in movie, Haruta & Chika.
 August 2017: Performed a solo concert at "Summer Paradise 2017."

Works

Filmography
Main roles are marked in bold.

Film
 Haruta & Chika (2017) as Haruta Kamijō
 Black Kōsoku (2019) as Sora Onoda

Television drama
 Hungry! (2012) as Sasuke Okusu
 Summer Nude (2013) as Shun Taniyama
 49 (2013) as Dan Kagami
 Wagahai no Heya de Aru (2017) as bicycle (voice only)
 99.9 Keiji Senmon Bengoshi — SEASON II (2018) as Yūta Ozaki
 Miss Devil: Jinji no Akuma Tsubaki Mako (2018) as Hiroshi Saitō
 I Want to Hold Aono-kun so Badly I Could Die (2022) as Ryūhei Aono

Anime
 One Piece: Episode of Nami - Tears of a Navigator, and the Bonds of Friends (2012) as villager

Radio
 Victory Roads (since 6 October 2017, Bay FM)

Solo concert 
 29 July and 11 August 2014 - Natsu Matsuri Special Event Sato Shori Solo Concert
 11–14 August 2015 - Sexy Zone A.B.C-Z Summer Paradise in TDC – Sato Shori Solo Concert
 Johnny's Summer Paradise 2016 - Sato Shori Solo Concert (Sato Shori Summer Live 2016)
 10-13 and 15 August 2017 - Johnny's Summer Paradise 2017 - Sato Shori Solo concert (Sato Shori Summer Live 2017 ~ Vic's Story)

Variety show
 The Shonen Club
 Johnny's Jr Land
 Koisuru Ganbarebu
 Koisuru Ganbarebu 2
 Koisuru Ganbarebu 3
 Real Scope Hyper
 Gamushara! [2014]
 Sexy Zone CHANNEL [2014]

References

Johnny & Associates
Japanese idols
1996 births
21st-century Japanese male actors
Living people
21st-century Japanese singers
21st-century Japanese male singers
Horikoshi High School alumni